Crossata ventricosa (swollen frog shell) is a species of sea snail, a marine gastropod mollusk in the family Bursidae, the frog shells.

Description
The length of the shell varies between 39 mm and 85 mm.

Distribution
This species occurs in the Pacific Ocean off Chile, Peru and Ecuador

References

External links
 

Bursidae
Gastropods described in 1833